Chromis circumaurea is a species of fish found in the family Pomacentridae. It differs from its cogenerates on a color and morphological basis.

References

Further reading
Quéro, Jean-Claude, Jérôme Spitz, and Jean-Jacques Vayne. "Chromis durvillei: une nouvelle espèce de Pomacentridae de l’île de la Réunion (France, océan Indien) et premier signalement pour l’île de Chromis axillaris."Cybium 33.4 (2009): 321–326.

External links

circumaurea
Fish described in 2008